Argentina participated in the 2011 Parapan American Games.

Medalists

Athletics

Argentina will send 21 male and 7 female athletes to compete.

Boccia

Argentina will send ten male and four female athletes to compete.

Cycling

Argentina will send four male and five female athletes to compete in the track cycling tournament.

Football 5-a-side

Argentina will send a team of eight athletes to compete.

Goalball

Argentina will send one team of six athletes to compete in the men's tournament.

Judo

Argentina will send five male and one female athlete to compete.

Powerlifting

Argentina will send two male athletes to compete.

Swimming

Argentina will send sixteen male and five female swimmers to compete.

Table tennis

Argentina will send twelve male and four female table tennis players to compete.

Wheelchair basketball

Argentina will send two teams of twelve athletes each to compete in the men's and women's tournaments.

Wheelchair tennis

Argentina will send two male and one female athlete to compete.

Nations at the 2011 Parapan American Games
2011 in Argentine sport
Argentina at the Pan American Games